Post-amendment to the Tamil Nadu Entertainments Tax Act 1939 on 1 August 1998, Gross fell to 130 per cent of Nett  Commercial Taxes Department disclosed 86 crore in entertainment tax revenue for the year.

Films
A list of films produced in the Tamil film industry in India in 1999 by release date:

January — March

April — June

July — September

October — December

Awards

References 

1999
Films, Tamil
Lists of 1999 films by country or language
1990s Tamil-language films